Max Aaron Lane (born February 22, 1971) is an American former football player who was an offensive lineman for seven seasons in the National Football League (NFL) from 1994-2000. He started in Super Bowl XXXI for the New England Patriots.

Lane was chosen with the 168th pick in the 1994 NFL Draft by the New England Patriots on April 25, 1994. He played in 100 regular season games and in 7 playoff games for the Patriots. He played offensive guard and tackle and was used as a blocking tight end in short yardage situations. Lane recovered five fumbles and advanced an airborne fumble by Troy Brown for 30 yards on October 15, 1995.

Lane was the starting right tackle for the Patriots for 16 games in 1995 and 1996. In 1997, Lane started at left guard for 15 games and at right tackle for one game. In 1998, he started at left guard for nine games and at right tackle for two games. In 1999, he started at left guard for three games, right guard for two games and right tackle for two games. In 2000, during his final season, Lane started at right guard for two games and at right tackle for three games. He was given the nickname "Big Country" by sports radio host Mike Adams.

Lane could be heard on NBC Sports Radio AM 1510 Boston every week.

References

1971 births
Living people
American football offensive linemen
Navy Midshipmen football players
New England Patriots players
People from Norborne, Missouri